Klahr is a surname. Notable people with the surname include:

Alfred Klahr (1904–1944), Austrian politician
David Klahr (born 1939), American psychologist
Jerome Klahr Huddle (1891–1959), American diplomat
Lewis Klahr (born 1956), American animator and filmmaker
Marco Lara Klahr, Mexican professor and journalist

See also
Klahr, Pennsylvania, United States